Tearless is the second studio album by Finnish electronic music duo Amnesia Scanner. It was released on June 19, 2020 by PAN.

Critical reception

Chal Ravens of Pitchfork reviewed "Their music grapples with life in the Anthropocene, drawing from nu-metal and hardcore in songs that feel burned out and overwhelmed."

Track listing
All tracks written by Amnesia Scanner.

References

2020 albums
Amnesia Scanner albums
PAN (record label) albums